Omoglymmius cycloderus is a species of beetle in the subfamily Rhysodidae. It was described by R.T. Bell and J.R. Bell in 2002. It is known from Batanta Island (West Papua, Indonesia).

Omoglymmius cycloderus holotype, a male, measures  in length.

References

cycloderus
Beetles of Indonesia
Endemic fauna of Indonesia
Beetles described in 2002